Louis Alfred Doumet, known by his stage name of Doumel,  (born 2 December 1889 in Marseille; died 23 May 1954 in Reillanne) was a French actor and comedian active in the inter-war years.

Biography 
Having moved to Paris thanks to the passion for the southern style, which flowered at the time with operettas and films on the subject, Doumel started to appear in small music halls and theatres, entertaining audiences with comic stories from Marseille, where he met other actors such as Gorlett and Rellys. Louis Doumel also appeared in various operettas and plays and recorded some discs of tall stories and Marseille jokes.

He appeared in his first film in 1926 and continued making films until the Second World War. He is best known for his appearances in César directed Marcel Pagnol, as the ill-advised friend of Marius, and with Fernandel in Ignace directed by Pierre Colombier.

Filmography 

 1926 : L'Inconnue des Six Jours (dir. René Sti) 
 1931 : Atout cœur (dir. Henry Roussell) - Cinema client
 1931 : Durand contre Durand (dir. Eugène Thiele and Léo Joannon)
 1931 : Les Galeries Lévy et Cie (also known as Les Galeries Washington and The Levy Department Stores) (dir. André Hugon) - César Patenolle
 1931 : La belle Madame Moïse (dir. Edmond T. Gréville, short film)
 1931 : Crime passionnel (dir. Edmond T. Gréville, short film)
 1932 : La Guerre des sauterelles (dir. Edmond T. Gréville, short film)
 1933 : L'Illustre Maurin (dir. André Hugon) - Capoufigue
 1933 : La Prison de Saint-Clothaire (dir. Pierre-Jean Ducis)
 1934 : Le Prince Jean (dir. Jean de Marguenat) - Café waiter
 1934 : Deux mille deux cent vingt deux C F 2 (dir. Victor de Fast, short film)
 1935 : Arènes joyeuses (dir. Karl Anton)
 1935 : Dora Nelson (dir. René Guissart) - Taxi driver
 1935 : Juanita (dir. Pierre Caron)
 1935 : Marseille (dir. Jean Monti and Jean Margueritte, short film) 
 1936 : Aventure à Paris (English title: Adventure in Paris) (dir. Marc Allégret)
 1936 : Blanchette (dir. Pierre Caron)
 1936 : César (dir. Marcel Pagnol) - Fernand
 1936 : Prête-moi ta femme (dir. Maurice Cammage)
 1936 : Sept hommes, une femme (Eng. title: Seven Men, One Woman) (dir. Yves Mirande)
 1936 : Une gueule en or (dir. Pierre Colombier) - The Barman
 1937 : Balthazar (dir. Pierre Colombier)
 1937 : L'Escadrille de la chance (dir. Max de Vaucorbeil)
 1937 : Ignace (dir. Pierre Colombier) - The Ajudant-chef
 1937 : Les Rois du sport (English title: The Kings of Sport) (dir. Pierre Colombier) - Boxing Club President
 1938 : Alexis gentleman chauffeur (dir. Max de Vaucorbeil) - Napoleon I
 1938 : Les Pirates du rail (dir. Christian-Jaque) - Morganty
 1938 : L'Avion de minuit (dir. Dimitri Kirsanoff)
 1938 : Ceux de demain / L'enfant de troupe (dir. Adelqui Millar and Georges Pallu)
 1938 : Le Dompteur (dir. Pierre Colombier)
 1938 : Lights of Paris (dir. Richard Pottier) - The Manager
 1938 : La Présidente (dir. Fernand Rivers) - Marius
 1939 : Grey contre X (dir. Pierre Maudru and Alfred Gragnon)
 1940 : La Comédie du bonheur (English title: Comedy of Happiness) (dir. Marcel L'Herbier) - Pernamboc

References

External links 
 

1889 births
1954 deaths
French male film actors
20th-century French male actors
Male actors from Marseille